Mikita Borykau (born 7 July 1992) is a Belarusian sprint canoeist.

He became World Champion at the 2021 ICF Canoe Sprint World Championships.

References

External links

1992 births
Living people
People from Rahachow
Belarusian male canoeists
ICF Canoe Sprint World Championships medalists in kayak
Canoeists at the 2020 Summer Olympics
Olympic canoeists of Belarus
Sportspeople from Gomel Region